Shem is the surname of the following notable people:
Shem Tov, multiple people
Adam Baal Shem, legendary rabbi and mystic
Goh V Shem (born 1989), Malaysian badminton player 
Kevin Shem (born 1993), Vanuatuan football defender
 Samuel Shem (born 1944), pen-name of American psychiatrist Stephen Joseph Bergman
Yoel Baal Shem, 17th century Orthodox Jewish scholar
Zechariah Shem (born 1994), Vanuatuan cricketer